"I Don't Know" is a rhythm and blues song recorded in October 1952 by Willie Mabon and His Combo. Mabon is credited as the songwriter, although blues historian Gerard Herzhaft notes that it was "inspired by Cripple Clarence Lofton".

The song was recorded at Universal Recording Corporation in Chicago. Chicago blues label Parrot Records originally issued it as a single, but Chess Records soon reissued it after purchasing Parrot. In 1952, the Chess single reached number one in the U.S. on Billboards R&B chart in December 1952. The song is included on several compilations of Mabon's recordings as well as various artists' collections from the period.

The song was covered by The Blues Brothers in 1978 for their live album A Briefcase Full of Blues.

References

1952 songs
1952 singles
American rhythm and blues songs
Chess Records singles